"Stay"  is the first track from Elisa's album Soundtrack '96-'06, it was the third single from the album and the first single from the international album Caterpillar, released in Italy, Switzerland and the Netherlands. Stay was released only download in Italy.

Track listing
CDs version
 "Stay" - 3:59
 "Life Goes On" - 5:22

Maxi CDs version
 "Stay" - 3:59
 "Life Goes On" - 5:22
 "Dancing" - 5:36

Release history

Music video
The music video was filmed by Marco Salom and Elisa in March 2007 in California exclusively for the Italian market. In June 2007 it was re-shot by Joe Tunmer in London for the international version of the video.

Chart performance

References

2007 singles
Elisa (Italian singer) songs
Songs written by Elisa (Italian singer)
English-language Italian songs
2007 songs
Sugar Music singles